Norbert Kerényi (born 10 April 1976, in Budapest) is a Hungarian football (defender) player who currently plays for Rákosmenti KSK.

References
HLSZ

1976 births
Living people
Footballers from Budapest
Hungarian footballers
Association football defenders
Nemzeti Bajnokság I players
Veikkausliiga players
Békéscsaba 1912 Előre footballers
Újpest FC players
Vasas SC players
Rovaniemen Palloseura players
FC Tatabánya players
Lombard-Pápa TFC footballers
BFC Siófok players
SC Obertann players
Hungarian expatriate footballers
Expatriate footballers in Finland
Expatriate footballers in Austria
Hungarian expatriate sportspeople in Finland
Hungarian expatriate sportspeople in Austria